Lauren Lucia Savoy is an American musician and film director.

Upon graduation from the London Film School, Savoy started directing music videos and commercials. She has original songs in the movie "Hawaii, Oslo" as well as "One Night at Mcool's."

In 1983 Lauren met  Pål Waaktaar-Savoy guitarist and songwriter of the band a-ha, they met in London at the Hippodrome nightclub and on December 21, 1991 they got married and on August 3, 1999 their first and only son True August was born, taking his nickname Augie

In 1995, Savoy and her husband formed the band Savoy with drummer Frode Unneland. Lauren is a co-writer on all Savoy albums.

Discography with Savoy
 Mary is Coming (1996)
 Lackluster Me (1997)
 Mountains of Time (1999)
 Reasons To Stay Indoors (2001)
 Savoy (2004)
 Savoy Songbook vol. 1 (2007)
 See The Beauty In Your Drab Hometown (2018)

Other appearances 
Lauren appeared on the A-ha track "You'll Never Get Over Me" from the album Minor Earth Major Sky, providing backing vocals. She also has co-writing credits on the A-ha songs "Between Your Mama and Yourself", "Cold River" and "The Sun Never Shone That Day".

Film
Lauren directed the short film "Scent of a Woman" which appeared in many festivals and won "Best of Fest" at the Broad Humor short festival as well as the audience favorite at DC shorts and Holly shorts film festivals. She directed the documentary "A-ha live in South America" and several music videos and commercials.

References

External links
mvdbase.com

Living people
Songwriters from Massachusetts
Musicians from Boston
21st-century American singers
21st-century American women singers
Year of birth missing (living people)